Vangueria burttii is a species of flowering plant in the family Rubiaceae. It is endemic to Tanzania. It was described by Bernard Verdcourt in 1981 and is named after the English botanist Brian Burtt.

References

External links
World Checklist of Rubiaceae

Endemic flora of Tanzania
burttii